Boalkhali Municipality is a self-governed entity that governs the town of Boalkhali in Chittagong District, Bangladesh. It is a part of Chittagong Division.

It was formed by former East Gomdandi Headquarter Union and one to six units of West Gomdandi union and one to three units of Kadhurkil Union Parishad.

Governance 
The area includes nine election units or wards. Every unit's voters elect one councillor and one female councillor by three units/wards.

Geography 
Boalkhali Municipality is located about 14 km east of Chittagong District and is west of Boalkhali Upazila. Khadurkhil Union is to the northeast of Khadurkhil and Popadia and the Saroathali Union of Boalkhali Municipality. To its south is Shakpura and to its west is Gomdandi union. Kharnafully river is situated in Boalkhali Municipality.

Naming 
The name comes from religious scholar and Islamic spiritual Hazarat Bu-ali kandahar Shah (RW). The upazila municipality name is also Boalkhali.

Administration 
Boalkhali Municipality is formed by the East Gomdandi Union, 1 to 6 NO union word of West Gomdandi and 1 to 3 union word of Khadurkhil Union in October 2012.

Wordwise area of Boalkhali Municipality:

References

External links
 
 

Chittagong District